The 30th National Assembly of Quebec was the provincial legislature in Quebec, Canada that was elected in the 1973 Quebec general election.  It sat for four sessions, from 22 November 1973 to 22 December 1973; from 14 March 1974 to 28 December 1974; from 18 March 1975 to 19 December 1975; and from 16 March 1976 to 18 October 1976. The governing Quebec Liberal Party was led by Premier Robert Bourassa; the Parti Québécois formed the official opposition for the first time, but since party leader René Lévesque did not have a seat, the leader of the opposition was Jacques-Yvan Morin.

Seats per political party

 After the 1973 elections

Member list

This was the list of members of the National Assembly of Quebec that were elected in the 1973 election:

Other elected MNAs

Other MNAs were elected in by-elections during the mandate

 Maurice Bellemare, Union Nationale, Johnson, August 28, 1974

Cabinet Ministers

 Prime Minister and Executive Council President: Robert Bourassa
 Deputy Premier: Gérard D. Levesque
 Agriculture: Normand Toupin (1973–1975), Thomas Kevin Drummond (1975–1976)
 Labour and Workforce: Jean Cournoyer (1973–1975), Gerald Harvey (1975–1976)
 Public Works: Maurice Tessier (1970, 1973), Bernard Pinard (1970–1973)
 Public Works and Provisioning: Raymond Mailloux (1973–1975), William Tetley (1975–1976)
 Public Office: Oswald Parent
 Cultural Affairs: Denis Hardy (1973–1975), Jean-Paul L'Allier (1975–1976)
 Immigration: Jean Bienvenue (1973–1976), Lise Bacon (1976)
 Social Affairs: Claude Castonguay (1973)
 Education: François Cloutier (1973–1975), Jerome Choquette (1975), Raymond Garneau (1975–1976), Jean Bienvenue (1976)
 Lands and Forests: Thomas Kevin Drummond (1973–1975), Normand Toupin (1975–1976)
 Tourism, Hunting and Fishing: Claude Simard
 Natural Resources: Jean-Gilles Massé (1973–1975), Jean Cournoyer (1975–1976)
 Transportation: Raymond Mailloux
 Communications: Jean-Paul L'Allier (1973–1975), Denis Hardy (1975–1976)
 Municipal Affairs and Environment: Victor Goldbloom
 Intergovernmental Affairs: Gérard D. Levesque (1973–1975), Francois Cloutier (1975–1976), Robert Bourassa (1976)
 Industry and Commerce: Guy Saint-Pierre
 Financial Institutions, Companies and Cooperatives: William Tetley (1973–1975)
 Consumers, Cooperatives and Financial : Lise Bacon (1975–1976)
 Justice: Jérôme Choquette (1973–1975), Gérard D. Levesque (1975–1976)
 Solicitor General: Fernand Lalonde (1975–1976)
 Finances and President of the Treasury Board: Raymond Garneau
 Revenu: Gérald Harvey (1973–1975), Robert Quenneville (1975–1976)
 State Ministers: Paul Phaneuf, Robert Quenneville (1973–1975), Lise Bacon (1973–1975), Paul Berthiaume, Bernard Lachapelle, Fernand Lalonde, Oswald Parent, Julien Giasson (1975–1976), Georges Vaillancourt

References
 1973 election results
 List of Historical Cabinet Ministers

Notes

30